100 Racks is an album by Yukmouth and Messy Marv in 2006.[]

Track listing

External links
 

2006 albums
Yukmouth albums
Messy Marv albums
Collaborative albums
Gangsta rap albums by American artists